Local Television or Local TV may refer to:

Local TV LLC, a 20-station television group in the United States later owned by Tribune Broadcasting
Local Television Limited, formerly Made Television, a group of 8 local stations in the United Kingdom
Local television in the United Kingdom
a local television blackout,  the non-airing of television or radio programming in a certain media market